The 1959–60 Hellenic Football League season was the seventh in the history of the Hellenic Football League, a football competition in England.

Premier Division

The Premier Division featured 14 clubs which competed in the division last season, along with three new clubs:
Swindon Town 'A'
Thatcham, promoted from Division One
Thame United

League table

Division One

The Division One featured 10 clubs which competed in the division last season, along with 2 new clubs:
17th Battalion R A O C
Botley United

League table

References

External links
 Hellenic Football League

1959-60
H